The 1990–91 Idaho Vandals men's basketball team represented the University of Idaho during the 1990–91 NCAA Division I men's basketball season. Members of the Big Sky Conference, the Vandals were led by first-year head coach Larry Eustachy and played their home games on campus at the Kibbie Dome in Moscow, Idaho.

At the conference tournament in Missoula, the Vandals defeated second-seed Nevada by nineteen points in the semifinals and were on the verge of a third consecutive title, but lost by eight points in the final to host Montana.

Postseason results

|-
!colspan=6 style=| Big Sky tournament

References

External links
Sports Reference – Idaho Vandals: 1990–91 basketball season
Gem of the Mountains: 1991 University of Idaho yearbook – 1990–91 basketball season
Idaho Argonaut – student newspaper – 1991 editions

Idaho Vandals men's basketball seasons
Idaho
Idaho
Idaho